Anita Municipal Airport , also known as Kevin Burke Memorial Field, is a city-owned public-use airport located one nautical mile (2 km) south of the central business district of Anita, a city in Cass County, Iowa, United States.

Facilities and aircraft 
It has one runway designated 5/23 with a turf surface measuring 2,825 by 95 feet (861 x 29 m). For the 12-month period ending March 18, 2009, the airport had 1,000 general aviation aircraft operations, an average of 83 per month.

References

External links 
 Anita Municipal Airport page at City of Anita website
 Anita Municipal - Burke Memorial Field (Y43) at Iowa DOT Airport Directory

Airports in Iowa
Transportation buildings and structures in Cass County, Iowa